Andreas Granskov Hansen (born 5 March 1989) is a Danish former professional footballer who played as a forward.

Club career
Granskov joined German Bundesliga club Werder Bremen as a youth, making a number of appearances for the reserve team. After his stay in Germany, he returned to Denmark to sign with Nordsjælland on 30 July 2009. Shortly after signing, he was sent on loan to AB. When Granskov left Nordsjælland in June 2012, he had made 53 appearances for the club, in which he scored 10 goals.

On 13 June 2012, Granskov signed with Belgian Pro League club Royal Excel Mouscron. Granskov, however, was injured for a long time during his spell with the club, and as a result failed to win a starting role.

After one season in Belgium, he returned to Denmark where he signed with Lyngby after a successful trial in July 2013. In January 2014, he signed with Brønshøj on a six-month deal. He would stay there for more than two years, before signing with Fremad Amager on 30 July 2016 where he played for six months. On 30 December 2016, it was confirmed, that Granskov had joined Rishøj Boldklub in the Denmark Series. In the summer 2017, Rishøj was refounded as Køge Nord FC.

In March 2020, Granskov joined Danish 2nd Division club Holbæk B&I, forming a striking duo with fellow former Superliga forward Gilberto Macena.

After his retirement, Granskov began playing old boys football with FC Græsrødderne, joining the team in September 2021.

International career
Granskov has been capped at international level for all teams from the Denmark under-16 to Denmark under-21 sides.

Honours
Nordsjælland
 Danish Superliga: 2011–12
 Danish Cup: 2009–10, 2010–11

References

External links

1989 births
Living people
Danish men's footballers
Association football forwards
Denmark under-21 international footballers
Akademisk Boldklub players
SV Werder Bremen II players
FC Nordsjælland players
Royal Excel Mouscron players
Lyngby Boldklub players
Brønshøj Boldklub players
Fremad Amager players
Køge Nord FC players
Holbæk B&I players
Tårnby FF players
Danish Superliga players
Danish 1st Division players
Danish 2nd Division players
Denmark Series players
3. Liga players
People from Gladsaxe Municipality
Danish expatriate men's footballers
Danish expatriate sportspeople in Germany
Danish expatriate sportspeople in Belgium
Expatriate footballers in Germany
Expatriate footballers in Belgium
Sportspeople from the Capital Region of Denmark